The president of the Massachusetts Senate is the presiding officer.  Unlike the United States Congress, in which the vice president of the United States is the ex officio president of the United States Senate, in Massachusetts, the president of the Senate is elected from and by the senators. The president, therefore, typically comes from the majority party, and the president is then the de facto leader of that party.

The current president of the Massachusetts Senate, since July 26, 2018, is Karen Spilka, a Democrat from Ashland. Democrats have had a majority in the Senate since 1959. Notable former presidents of the Massachusetts Senate include U.S. president Calvin Coolidge.

List of presidents of the Massachusetts Senate 

A = American, D = Democratic, R = Republican, W = Whig

See also
 List of speakers of the Massachusetts House of Representatives
 List of Massachusetts General Courts

Notes

Bibliography 
 The Massachusetts State House, p. 141-42. Commonwealth of Massachusetts: Boston, 1953.

External links 
 Senate Rules (rules 1-5B relate to the President)

 
Lists of Massachusetts politicians
1780 establishments in Massachusetts